Jules' Undersea Lodge is an American hotel located in Key Largo, Florida and is the only underwater hotel in the United States. It is 30 feet (9 m) deep on the ocean floor and guests have to scuba dive to get to their rooms.  The hotel is located at the bottom of the Emerald Lagoon and was opened in 1986.  The hotel's name comes from the novelist Jules Verne, author of 20,000 Leagues Under the Sea. Scuba certification is required for entrance as the front door is located  under water.

Jules'  has over 10,000 overnight guests in its 30 years of operation. Today, many certified divers who are interested stay in the Jules' Underwater Lodge, and some who meet the skill and bottom time requirements and participate in underwater experiments in the MarineLab can elect to receive specialty diver recognition from PADI or NAUI as a Recreational Aquanaut. This is the only Recreational Aquanaut qualification available worldwide. Today, Aquanaut Hotel guests must scuba-dive to reach the facility, and a nearby land base offers diving lessons for people who are unfamiliar with the activity. Years ago, non-scuba diving guests were taken down to the lodge breathing air pumped down from the surface through a long hose similar to a garden hose, but this practice was discontinued and now all guests must scuba-dive to the lodge entrance five fathoms below. The air hose system has been replaced by a hookah rig, featuring modern scuba regulator second stages, and is often used by guests and the operations crew to get back and forth to the lodge without donning scuba gear.

Amenities
Jules’ Undersea Lodge was formerly the La Chalupa Research Laboratory, an undersea marine lab operated off Puerto Rico in the 1970s. The lodge features a 2 bedroom 1 bath retreat that can be rented for a night. The hotel also offers a scuba diving school.

See also

References

External links

 Photos of Jules' Undersea Lodge

Hotel buildings completed in 1986
Buildings and structures in Monroe County, Florida
Underwater habitats
1986 establishments in Florida